Geonhwang of Balhae (r. 857–871) was the 12th king of Balhae. He was the younger brother of Dae Ijin, his predecessor on the throne.

Because none of Balhae's own records have survived, we know little of Geonhwang except that he sent a few missions to Japan and Tang China.

See also
List of Korean monarchs
History of Korea

References

Balhae rulers
871 deaths
9th-century rulers in Asia